The University of Santo Tomas Faculty of Medicine and Surgery (USTFMS) is the medical school of the University of Santo Tomas, the oldest and largest Catholic university in Manila, Philippines.

Established in 1871, the faculty is the first medical school in the Philippines. It is proclaimed to be a Center of Excellence by the Commission on Higher Education.

In 2018, LEAPMed, a special preparatory course for the UST medicine program was offered to high school graduates.

History

Petition for the establishment of colleges dedicated to medicine and pharmacy started in 1682, Sixty-one years after the foundation of the university. In November 22 of the same year, the Spanish granted the petition but nothing came of it due to financial and technical difficulties. By 1785, the Dominican Friars put it on the priority list and despite the enthusiasm of Governor General Mariano Folgueras, the planned colleges failed to materialize until the late 19th century.

The faculty was founded in 1871 by virtue of the modified Moret Decree of 1870 which supplants the Philippine educational reforms of 1865 by the Spanish Government. The original Moret Decree calls for the secularization of the university to be renamed as "Universidad de Filipinas," Upon the protests of religious groups, parents and the Archdiocese of Manila, the decree was modified to remove the inimical provisions. The modified decree was approved and promulgated on October 29, 1875, by the Governor General of the Islands, Don Rafael Izquierdo.

The faculty was eventually associated with Colegio de San Jose as both were suffering from lack of financial support. Both institutions were saved by Dr. Esteban Rodriguez de Figueroa's last will and testament which stated that his wealth be given to the Society of Jesus. The haciendas of Colegio de San Jose were turned over to the University of Santo Tomas as ordered by Governor General Domingo Moriones y Muralla in 1879. These were returned to the Society of Jesus in 1910 which was to fund a seminary now known as the San Jose Seminary.

It was also associated with the San Juan de Dios Hospital which functioned as the faculty's clinical arm as decreed by King Alfonso of Spain on October 29, 1875. This setup continued until 1941 when the Japanese took over Quezon Institute and transferring all of its medical staff and patients to San Juan de Dios Hospital. Clinical training during this time was in partnership with Saint Paul Hospital in Intramuros until the walled city's destruction during the Liberation of Manila.

With the reopening of the faculty in Sampaloc campus, it experienced substantial growth. In 1932, the faculty began to accept female students and by 1937, about 30 women physicians graduated.

The faculty consistently ranks among the top performing medical schools in the country.

Academics
The faculty offers the four-year Doctor of Medicine degree, a comprehensive professional academic program which combines lectures, case analyses, and practical simulation exercises. The entire curriculum focuses on the basic, clinical, and emergency medical sciences. Teaching methods make use of both classic and modern medical practices and technologies.

In 2001, the faculty adopted the problem-based learning method for use in the curriculum. The move was highly controversial. Several professors complained that the medical students were not learning the basic sciences adequately. In 2003, the curriculum format combined elements of both traditional (lecture-based) and problem-based methods. Contrary to what was expected as a decline in the quality of the learning of students by some faculty members the first and second batches of PBL trained physicians garnered a 92 & 96% passing percentages, respectively. This data complemented the 10-year study on outcome improvements using PBL conducted at Harvard School of Medicine from 1994 to 2004.

The graduating students undergo a series of written and oral exams known as the revalida, a qualifying examination prior to graduation. In the oral examinations, groups of three students each are questioned by panels composed of three professors on basic, clinical, and emergency medical sciences. Passing the revalida is a prerequisite to graduation. Medical school graduates qualify to take the licensure exams for physicians conducted by the Board of Medicine, and under the control and supervision of the Professional Regulation Commission of the Philippines.

The faculty regularly conducts postgraduate courses covering specialties and subspecialties (i.e. sports medicine, family medicine, geriatrics and gerontology, alternative medicine).

Programs
 Undergraduate program
 Basic Human Studies (2018) - alternative name for the program is Learning-Enhanced Accelerated Program for Medicine (LEAPMed).
 Masters programs
 Clinical Audiology (1999)
 Pain Management (2008)
 Public Health International (2018) - ladderized program with the University of Leeds, United Kingdom
 Professional graduate degree
Doctor of Medicine (1916)

Admissions

About 480 students out of 1,700-1,900 applications are accepted into the Doctor of Medicine program. Among this number, approximately 80% are graduates of UST. Most of the qualified applicants are graduates of biology, medical technology, nursing, occupational therapy, physical therapy and psychology, but graduates from other Bachelor of Science or Bachelor of Arts programs are still accepted. Applicant selection is based on GWA score of at least 2.00/B+/86%, NMAT score of at least 85%ile, and the faculty entrance examination score.

The top 200 college applicants of the UST Entrance Test (USTET) undergo an interview process to assess their preparedness for the B.S. Basic Human Studies (LEAPMed) program.  Only 90 students are accepted to the program.

Research
The Research Center for the Health Sciences (RCHS) is the university's unit for the health sciences. It is the research arm of the faculty. Journal of Medicine, University of Santo Tomas (JMUST) is a bi-annual, open-access, peer-reviewed journal. It is the official publication of the faculty and the UST Hospital.

Performance and rankings
The medicine program is declared as Center of Excellence by the Commission on Higher Education.

It has been producing several topnotchers in the national licensure exams for Filipino doctors and enjoyed its LEVEL III accreditation from PAASCU recently. It has also produced several Secretaries of Health of the Philippines and several presidents of the Philippine Medical Association. The faculty has also produced numerous hospital administrators, medical directors, clinical specialists & scientists, and medical professors.

The faculty garnered a passing rate of 99% in the physician's licensure examination held last August 2009 and August 2010. The faculty was also ranked as the only Asian medical school to be in the top 10 list of foreign medical institutions by the U.S. Educational Commission for Foreign Medical Graduates in 2007.

Henry Sy Sr. Hall
The Henry Sy Sr. Hall will house the Sts. Cosmas and Damian Simulation and Research Center of the faculty. In January 2020, the faculty began its sesquicentennial celebration with the reveal of the building. It was initially named after the patron saints of the college Saints Cosmas and Damian.

In October 2022, at the end of the faculty's anniversary celebration, the building project was relaunched as the Henry Sy Sr. Hall. It was named after the founder of SM Supermalls, as requested by his daughter Teresita Sy-Coson, whose foundation donated ₱300 million to the UST Research and Endowment Foundation.

The hall will house an audiology laboratory that will be named after Dr. William F. Austin, founder of the United States-based company Starkey Hearing Technologies. The Starkey Foundation donated $200,000 for the naming rights of the laboratory.

Student organizations
 Medicine Student Council
 Asian Medical Students’ Association
 Medical Missions, Inc.
 UST Medicine Glee Club
 UST Pax Romana – Medicine Unit
 UST Terpsichorian Circle

Sesquicentennial
The faculty opened its 150th foundation anniversary celebration in January 2020. A fundraising and dinner-dance ball entitled, UST Med Gala was held at the Shangri-La at the Fort, Manila. One of the goals of the event was to fund the Anargyroi Foundation Inc., an independent organization that manages donations and supports the faculty's scholars. In the same month, the groundbreaking rites for the construction of the Saints Cosmas and Damian Simulation and Research Center was also held in front of the Miguel de Benavides Library. The legacy project was later named Henry Sy Sr. Hall, following the donation of ₱300,000,000 of Teresita Sy-Coson to the foundation.

COVID-19 pandemic
In February 2021, Manila city mayor Isko Moreno, approved the university's plan to hold face-to-face classes for the students of medicine and other health programs. However, because of the surge of COVID-19 cases in March, the plan did not materialize.
On June 9, 2021, medical clerks or fourth year medical students had limited face-to-face classes for the first time since March 2020. The faculty was the first college to hold actual classes in the university.

Alumni
Secretaries of the Department of Health
 Basilio J. Valdes — 1945
 Jose Locsin — 1945—1946
 Antonio Villarama 
 Paulino Garcia
 Elpidio Valencia
 Francisco Q. Duque, Jr.
 Floro Dabu
 Manuel Cuenco
 Paulino Garcia
 Antonio Periquet
 Carmencita Reodica
 Francisco Duque

Jose Rizal, the national hero of the Philippines, enrolled in the faculty to pursue foundational courses in medicine. He pursued further studies in Ophthalmology at Madrid Central University (now Complutense University of Madrid), the University of Paris, and the University of Heidelberg in Germany.

References

Medical schools in the Philippines
Educational institutions established in 1871
Graduate schools in the Philippines
Medicine and Surgery
1871 establishments in the Philippines